Bridges to Prosperity is a United States-based nonprofit organization that partners with local governments to connect communities via pedestrian bridges. Bridges to Prosperity is based in Denver, Colorado, with staff around the world.

Footbridges are simple for rural communities to build with only modest support, while the impact is great. A randomized control study completed at the University of Notre Dame concluded that bridge connectivity increases household income 32%, while farmers increase agricultural outputs and labor rates increase 30%.

Since its foundation, Bridges to Prosperity has connected over 1.2 million people, has built over 350 footbridges, and expanded to 22 countries across Southeast Asia, Africa, and Central and South America. It is supported by partner organizations including Rotary International. In 2019, Bridges to Prosperity partnered with the government of Rwanda to build 380 additional footbridges. A similar program, designed to build every bridge inside the country, was started in Uganda in 2018.

Mission 
"We work with isolated communities to create access to essential health care, education and economic opportunities by building footbridges over impassable rivers.
Our vision: We envision a world where poverty caused by rural isolation no longer exists.
Our belief:  Rural isolation is a root cause of poverty. Connection is the foundation for opportunity."

History 

 
Bridges to Prosperity was established by Kenneth Frantz in 2001, after seeing a photo in National Geographic Magazine of a broken bridge over the Blue Nile River in Ethiopia, with ten men on either side of the broken span pulling themselves across the chasm by rope.

Transport is a crucial driver of development, bringing socio-economic opportunities within the reach of the poor and enabling economies to be more competitive. Transport infrastructure connects people to jobs, education, and health services; it enables the supply of goods and services around the world; and allows people to interact and generate the knowledge that creates long-term growth. Rural roads, for example, can help prevent maternal deaths through timely access to childbirth-related care, boost girls’ enrollment in school, and increase and diversify farmers’ income by connecting them to markets.

The World Bank estimates that over 1 billion people do not have access to transportation networks. B2P determined that positive results could be attained by spreading the technology by building approximately 10–20 demonstration bridges per country, training locals, partnering with local technological institutes, providing downloadable and easy to use step by step photo and video manuals, and supplying free wire rope and wire rope clamps/clips for post training/demonstration programs. As there is much relating to best practices B2P has focused on education and training, and the propagation of technical manuals, and footbridge building text books.

Bridges to Prosperity provides the needed capital in the form of free recycled wire rope and strand. Best practice dictates that when capital is provided in this manner, that there are no unintended consequences, e.g. B2P does not provide free cable to countries where there is an existing or budding wire rope industry. Materials are not donated where that would cause unintended harm to existing business. In 2005, B2P received a long term donation of free 7/8 inch to 1.25 inch wire rope from the ports of Portsmouth and Norfolk, Virginia. The wire rope donated was American manufactured high tensile steel wire rope used on gantry cranes for unloading container ships. Later, the port of Baltimore was added, as were Texas and west coast ports.  In 2012, approximately 100,000 feet of such donated used wire rope and strand was shipped in an intermodal container to programs all over the world. To build one footbridge, the average number of feet of wire rope required is approximately 1,800 feet.  Worldwide, there is enough recycled wire rope from gantry cranes to build approximately 2,500 footbridges every year. Each container shipped overseas weighs approximately 52,000 pounds and contains 20,000 feet of cable.

Charity Navigator rated Bridges to Prosperity, Inc their top rating, four stars.

Awards 
Bridges to Prosperity has been recognized by a number of global awards. In 2016, B2P was named the 2016 Eurostar Ashden Award for Sustainability, and one of the top 10 Social Enterprises in the world by Classy

Corporate sponsorship 

Building on the affinity with construction firms, especially those that design and build highway bridges, a corporate sponsor program was started to allow employees to form teams to design and build footbridges. Today, B2P provides co-branded bridge building opportunities for companies around the world ranging from financial services firms to construction industry giants.

The original industry partners included Ross Construction of Palo Alto, California, and Flatiron Construction, along with Flatiron's parent company, Hochtief of Germany. By 2019 over 50 industry partners included Parsons Corporation, COWI, Alridge, Berger Charitable Foundation, Balfour Beatty, Europengineers, Institution of Civil Engineers, Kiewit, Michael Baker, NSBA, Railroad Construction Co, Thornton Tomasetti, WSP, American Bridge, Arup, Bechtel, Burohappold, FHECOR, HDR, Freyssinet, IBT, Knights Brown, KPFF, McNary Bergeron, Mott MacDonald, PCL, Price & Myers, Ramboll Fonden, Tony Gee, Traylor Bros, Walsh, and Weston & Sampson.

Rotary 
An important supporter have been various Rotary International clubs who collaborate in providing Rotary Foundation matched humanitarian grants.

When Bridges to Prosperity was founded by a member of the Gloucester Point Rotary Club in Gloucester, Virginia. That club assisted in the purchase of materials for the repair of the Blue Nile Bridge. Over 65 rotary clubs worldwide (and over 800 individual Rotarians) have participated directly in Bridges to Prosperity programs.

Partnerships with the local developing country Rotary clubs, such as the Rotary Club of Nkwazi, Lusaka, Zambia, facilitate access and operation in countries with little bureaucratic interference. The partnerships with local Rotary clubs allow quick customs clearance of wire rope imports and expedited business contacts, allow USA based Rotarians to easily travel and participate in schemes as well as adding a defense against potential corruption.

University programs 

Support from CEO Avery Bang's alma mater, the University of Iowa engineering school, and non-profit Continental Crossings has led the construction of three additional bridges.

Other university engineering programs include Arizona State University, NDSEED, and Virginia Tech, among others. Effective September 1, 2018, the university program was spun off into its own entity with Engineers in Action.

Financial information 

Estimated revenues for fiscal 2019-20 were $6,000,000, with corporate and foundation donors playing a much larger role.  In the fiscal year ending 8/2012, the organization had revenues of $2,289,404 contributed as follows: 
Corporate sponsors = 16.8%
Grants & foundations = 38%
In-kind donations (wire rope, technical design, etc.) = 33.1%
Material sponsors = 10.4%
Membership & donors = 1.7%

References

External links
Bridges to Prosperity
How It All Started > Video
Bridge Design & Engineering Issue 46 - Charity Link Brings Footbridge To Fruition
The Rotarian - Bridging Worlds
National Public Radio audio file

Bridges
Footbridges
Pedestrian infrastructure
Non-profit organizations based in Colorado
2001 establishments in the United States